Troms og Finnmark (lit. Troms and Finnmark in English), is a county under disestablishment in northern Norway that was established on 1 January 2020 as the result of a regional reform. Its lifespan as county is only temporary, as it was decided to cease to exist from January 1st 2024. It was formed by the merger of the former Finnmark and Troms counties in addition to Tjeldsund Municipality from Nordland county.

The administrative centre of the county is split between two towns. The political and administrative offices are based in city of Tromsø (the seat of the old Troms county). The county governor is based in town of Vadsø (the seat of the old Finnmark county).

On 1 January 2024, the county will be demerged back to the counties Finnmark and Troms; parliament decided that on 15 June 2022; the Tjeldsund Municipality from Nordland county will belong to Troms county.

Geography

Troms og Finnmark is the northernmost and easternmost county in Norway (Svalbard is not considered a county). By area, it is Norway's largest county, and also one of the least populated of all Norwegian counties.

Knivskjellodden in Nordkapp Municipality (on the island of Magerøya) sometimes considered the northernmost point of Europe (on an island); Kinnarodden on Nordkinn Peninsula in Lebesby Municipality is the northernmost point on the European mainland. Honningsvåg in Finnmark claims to be the northernmost city of the world, and Vardø is the easternmost town in Norway and is farther east than Istanbul.

The coast is indented by large fjords, many of which (in a strict sense) are false fjords, as they are not carved out by glaciers. Some of Norway's largest sea bird colonies can be seen on the northern coast, the largest are Hjelmsøystauran on the island of Hjelmsøya in Måsøy Municipality and Gjesværstappan in Nordkapp Municipality. Both Øksfjordjøkelen and Seilandsjøkelen (Seiland glacier) are located in the western part of Finnmark.

The Øksfjord plateau glacier calved directly into the sea (Jøkelfjorden) until 1900, the last glacier in mainland Norway to do so. The central and eastern part of Finnmark is generally less mountainous, and has no glaciers. The land east of Nordkapp is mostly below .

The geography varies from barren coastal areas facing the Barents Sea, to more sheltered fjord areas and river valleys with gullies and tree vegetation. About half of the county is above the tree line, and large parts of the other half is covered with small Downy birch.

The lushest areas are the Alta area and the Tana valleys, and in the east is the lowland area in the Pasvik valley in Sør-Varanger, where the pine and Siberian spruce forest is considered part of the Russian taiga vegetation. This valley has the highest density of Brown bears in Norway, and is the only location in the country with a population of musk-rats, resulting from their introduction from their native North America into Europe in the early 20th century which included their release in a total of 293 localities all over Finland from 1919 and onwards, and then of ca 1,000 muskrats on the Kola Peninsula during 1931–1936. In 1970, another specimen was collected from Jarfjorden in the Sør-Varanger district in Finnmark (Pedersen 1970). Between 1980 and 1988 there were very few observations of muskrats in Norway (Lund & Wikan 1995), but since 1988 there has been a rapid population increase in Sör-Varanger, and the muskrat has spread to almost every part of the municipality. Lynx and moose are common in large parts of Finnmark, but rare on the coast.

The plateau is famous for its tens of thousands of reindeer owned by the Sami, and swarms of mosquitos in mid-summer. Finnmarksvidda makes up 36% of the county's area. Stabbursdalen National Park ensures protection for the world's most northern pine forest.

The Tana River, which partly defines the border with Finland, gives the largest catch of salmon of all rivers in Europe, and also has the world record for Atlantic salmon, . In the east, the Pasvikelva defines the border with Russia.

Several glaciers are located in Kvænangen, including parts of the Øksfjordjøkelen, the last glacier in mainland Norway to drop icebergs directly into the sea (in the Jøkelfjord). Marble is present in parts of Troms, and thus numerous caves, as in Salangen and Skånland.

Climate

Troms og Finnmark has short and often cool summers, but sometimes warm continental air from southeast Europe or Russia can give surprisingly warm temperatures. The all-time high was  recorded in Bardufoss July 2018, but a new record was set in Banak, Porsanger with  July 5, 2021. The warmest night was at Makkaur in Båtsfjord with overnight low  on July 19, 2018, the third warmest night recorded in Norway. The winters are fairly mild along the coast due to the temperate sea, but still cold enough for snow. Inland, winters are much colder and drier, especially east of the Lyngen Alps.
Due to the proximity to the ice-free ocean, winters are much milder in coastal areas (and windier). Torsvåg Lighthouse in Karlsøy has coldest month (February) 24-hr average , and even Fruholmen near North Cape has coldest month mean . Thaws can occur along the coast even in mid-winter. 
The year average temperature difference between Harstad on the coast in the south and Kautokeino inland northeast is (6 °C) comparable to the difference between Harstad and London.

There is often snow in abundance and avalanches are not uncommon in winter in steep areas. With the prevailing westerlies, lowland areas east of mountain ranges have less precipitation than areas west of the mountains.
Skibotn in Storfjord is the location in Norway which has recorded the most days per year with clear skies (no clouds).
 
In the Köppen climate classification, most areas of below the treeline have a boreal climate (subarctic), while the coast west of North Cape mostly has a subpolar oceanic climate (Cfc). Highlands and mountains above the treeline have alpine tundra climate (Et). 

Harstad is located on Norway's largest coastal island in the southwest of the province.

Lakselv Airport Banak in Porsanger has a boreal climate with sparse precipitation.

Midnight sun

Situated far north of the Arctic Circle, Troms og Finnmark has midnight sun from the middle of May until late July. Conversely, in two months of the winter, from late November to late January, the county experiences polar nights where the sun is always below the horizon. As a consequence, there is continuous daylight from early May to early August. At midwinter, there is only a bluish twilight for a couple of hours around noon, which can almost reach full daylight if there are clear skies to the south.

Northern lights
The county is situated in the Aurora Borealis zone, and because of the dry climate with frequent clear skies, Alta Municipality was early chosen as a location for the study of this strange light phenomenon. For this reason, Alta is sometimes referred to as the city of the northern lights.

History
People have lived in this area for at least 10,000 years (since the early Stone Age), and there are prehistoric rock carvings at several locations (for instance Ibestad, Balsfjord, Komsa, Pit-Comb Ware culture and Rock carvings at Alta). These people made their living from hunting, fishing, and gathering. The destiny of these early cultures is unknown. Three ethnic groups have a long history in the area: the Sami people, the Norwegian people, and the Kven people. Of these, the Sami probably were the first people to explore what is now Troms og Finnmark. Ohthere of Hålogaland was an adventurous Norwegian (Norseman) from Hålogaland, the area roughly corresponding to today's Nordland county. Around 890 AD, he claimed, according to historical sources (see Ohthere of Hålogaland) that he lived "north-most of all the Northmen", and that "no one [lived] to the north of him." Later, Norwegians in the 14th century, and Kvens in the 16th century, settled along the coast. See the articles on Kven people and Vardøhus Fortress for more details.

Southern and mid-Troms was a Norwegian petty kingdom in the Viking Age, and considered part of Hålogaland. Ottar from Hålogaland met King Alfred the Great around 890. The Viking leader Tore Hund had his seat at Bjarkøy. According to the sagas, Tore Hund speared King Olav Haraldsson at the Battle of Stiklestad. He also traded and fought in Bjarmaland, today the area of Arkhangelsk in northern Russia . Trondenes (today's Harstad) was also a central Viking power centre.

Sami

The Sami are the indigenous people of the area, but Norwegians have lived for hundreds of years on the islands' outer parts, where they made up the majority. The Sami people still constitute the majority in Finnmark's interior parts, while the fjord areas have been ethnically mixed for a long time. This essentially holds true today.

The Sami were for many years victims of the Norwegianization policy, which in essence was an attempt by the government to make them "true" Norwegians and forget about their Sami way of life and religion, which was seen as inferior. As a result, the Sami living at the coast and in the fjords gradually lost much of their culture and often felt ashamed by their Sami inheritance. The Sami in the interior managed to preserve more of their culture. In the 1970s, instruction of the Sami language started in schools, and a new sense of consciousness started to grow among the Sami; today most are proud of their background and culture.

In the midst of this awakening (1979), Norway's government decided to build a dam in Alta to produce hydropower, provoking many Sami and environmentalists to demonstrations and civil disobedience (Altasaken). In the end, the dam was built on a much smaller scale than originally intended and the Sami culture was on the government's agenda. The Sami parliament (Sámediggi) was opened in Karasjok in 1989.

Norwegian

Gjesvær in Nordkapp is mentioned in the Sagas (Heimskringla) as a northern harbor in the Viking Age, especially used by Vikings on the way to Bjarmaland (see Ottar from Hålogaland), and probably also for gathering food in the nearby seabird colony. Coastal areas of Finnmark were colonized by Norwegians beginning in the 10th century, and there are stories describing clashes with the Karelians. Border skirmishes between the Norwegians and Novgorodians continued until 1326, when the Treaty of Novgorod settled the issue.

The first known fortification in Finnmark is Vardøhus festning, first erected in 1306 by King Haakon V Magnusson. This is the world's most northern fortress. In the 17th century, 88 young women were burned as witches in Vardø, an extremely high number compared to the total population in this area at the time. [appears to be a dead/nonsense link] However, the first person burned as witch in Vardø in the 17th century was not a woman, but a man. [Vardø archives]

Finnmark first became subject to increased colonization in the 18th and 19th centuries. Norway, Sweden, and Russia all claimed control over this area. Finland was part of Russia at that time and had no independent representative. Finnmark was given the status of an Amt (county) in the 19th century. For a time, there was a vibrant trade with Russia (Pomor trade), and many Norwegians settled on the Kola Peninsula (see Kola Norwegians).

Kven

The Finnic Kven residents of Finnmark are largely descendants of Finnish speaking immigrants who arrived in the area in the 18th century from Meänmaa, and later in the 19th century from Finland, suffering from famine and war.

Governance
In 1576, the King of Norway established Vardøhus len as a new administrative unit for the kingdom. In 1660, it became Vardøhus amt, a subordinate to the large Trondhjems stiftamt, based in Trondheim. In 1787, the island of Senja and the Troms area were transferred from Nordlandenes amt to Vardøhus amt (an area similar to today's Troms og Finnmark county). In 1866, the island of Senja and the Troms area were separated from Vardøhus to form the new Tromsø amt. In 1919, the names were again changed to Finnmark fylke and Troms fylke.

World War II
Per Fugelli has said that World War II resulted in many persons acquiring psychiatric disorders (psykiske senskadene) which could be from experiencing "bombing, accidents involving mines, burning down of homes, forcible evacuation, illness and starvation during the war and liberation. But it was maybe in particular the treatment of Russian prisoners that left marks on the local population."

Towards the end of World War II, with Operation Nordlicht, the Germans used the scorched earth tactic in Finnmark and northern Troms to halt the Red Army. As a consequence of this, few houses survived the war, and a large part of the population was forcefully evacuated further south (Tromsø was crowded), but many people avoided evacuation by hiding in caves and mountain huts and waiting until the Germans were gone, then inspected their burned homes. There were 11,000 houses, 4,700 cow sheds, 106 schools, 27 churches, and 21 hospitals burned. There were 22,000 communications lines destroyed, roads were blown up, boats destroyed, animals killed, and 1,000 children separated from their parents.

However, after taking the town of Kirkenes on 25 October 1944 (as the first town in Norway), the Red Army did not attempt further offensives in Norway. Free Norwegian forces arrived from Britain and liberated the rest of the county. When the war was over, more than 70,000 people were left homeless in Finnmark. The government imposed a temporary ban on residents returning to Finnmark because of the danger of landmines. The ban lasted until the summer of 1945 when evacuees were told that they could finally return home.

Cold War (1947–1991)
To keep tensions from getting too high, Norway declared that no NATO exercises would take place in Finnmark. There was, however, a lot of military intelligence activity, and Norwegian P-3 Orion maritime surveillance aircraft were often the first to get pictures of newly built Soviet submarines and aircraft. A purpose-built ELINT vessel, Marjata, was always stationed near the border, and the current Marjata (7500 t) is still operating out of the ports in eastern Finnmark.

Merging of Troms County and Finnmark County
The merger has not been popular, especially in the old Finnmark county. A county-wide non-binding referendum was held in which it was opposed by about 87% of Finnmark residents who voted, but the Storting did not reverse its decision to merge the county. Some political parties have since been campaigning to reverse the merger in the parliamentary term that starts in September 2021. On 28 October 2021, Minister of Local Government Bjørn Arild Gram sent a letter to the county confirming that it will be demerged.

Later
On 17 March 2021, organisations reported that the county council sent an application to Norway's government to have the county split back up.

On 28 October 2021, the Norwegian government confirmed that Troms and Finnmark would become two separate counties again.

Government

A county (fylke) is the chief local administrative area in Norway. The whole country is divided into 11 counties. A county is also an election area, with popular votes taking place every 4 years.

In Troms og Finnmark, the government of the county is the Troms og Finnmark County Municipality. It includes 57 members who are elected to form a county council (Fylkesting). Heading the Fylkesting is the county mayor (fylkesordførar), Ivar B. Prestbakmo (as of 2021).

The county also has a fylkesrådsleder, the top executive of the county's administration, Bjørn Inge Mo.

The county also has a County Governor (statsforvalter) who is the representative of the King and Government of Norway. Elisabeth Aspaker is the current County Governor of Troms og Finnmark.

On 1 January 2019, Elisabeth Aspaker was appointed as the County Governor of Troms og Finnmark.

The municipalities in Troms og Finnmark are divided among several district courts (tingrett): Alta District Court, Hammerfest District Court, Indre Finnmark District Court, Nord-Troms District Court, Senja District Court, Trondenes District Court, and Øst-Finnmark District Court. All of these courts are subordinate to the Hålogaland Court of Appeal district based in Tromsø.

Municipalities

Troms og Finnmark County has a total of 39 municipalities:

References

 
Counties of Norway
2020 establishments in Norway
States and territories established in 2020